Séamus McCarthy (born 1954) is an Irish former Gaelic footballer who played at senior level for the Tipperary county team.

Born in Bansha, County Tipperary, McCarthy first arrived on the inter-county scene at the age of seventeen when he first linked up with the Tipperary minor team in 1972  before later joining the under-21 side in 1974 and 1975. He joined the senior panel during the 1974 championship. McCarthy subsequently became a regular member of the starting fifteen.

At club level McCarthy is a three-time championship medallist with Galtee Rovers.

McCarthy retired from inter-county football following the conclusion of the 1982 championship.

In retirement from playing McCarthy became involved in team management and coaching. He has served as manager and selector with the Tipperary minor, under-21, junior and senior teams.

He was also an umpire, who aged 21 during the 1975 All-Ireland Senior Football Championship Final, became part of the first father-and-son pair (with his 50-year-old father Eddie) to umpire at an All-Ireland final.

Honours

Player
Galtee Rovers
Tipperary Senior Football Championship (3): 1976, 1980, 1981
Tipperary Under 21 Championship (1): 1975

Manager
Tipperary
 Tipperary- Munster Minor Football Champions : 1984
 Tipperary- All Ireland 'B'  Senior Football Champions: 1995
 Tipperary- Munster and All Ireland Junior Football Champions: 1998
 Tipperary- Tommy Murphy Cup Senior Football Champions: 2005
Munster
 Munster- Railway Cup Champions: 1999
Ireland
 Ireland- International Rules Selector: 2013, 2014

References

1954 births
Living people
Gaelic football managers
Galtee Rovers Gaelic footballers
Gaelic football selectors
Gaelic football umpires
Tipperary inter-county Gaelic footballers